Xestospongia bergquistia is a species of barrel sponge in the family Petrosiidae first described by Jane Fromont in 1991. The species epithet, bergquistia, honours the New Zealand sponge specialist, Patricia Bergquist.

Habitat 
X. bergquistia occurs at depths of 5–15 m in full light  on substrates of rock or dead coral.

Description 
X. bergquistia is an erect, red-brown, cup-shaped sponge, with vertical ridges on the outer surface. The sponge varies in size from 15 cm to 1.5 m high, with the cup at its apex forming a central hollow up to one third its height. It is a firm but springy sponge.

References

Animals described in 1991
Petrosina
Taxa named by Jane Fromont